Canuto Francia (January 28, 1904 – September 4, 1979), better known as Canuplin, was a Filipino stage performer and magician who gained fame for his impersonation of Charlie Chaplin in Filipino movies and the local bodabil circuit.

Biography
Canuplin was born in Tondo, Manila, but grew up in Divisoria. At age 11, he won "best in costume" while dressed as Chaplin in a local fair. As his prize, he was employed as a barker at a circus. Soon, he was featured in the circus as a magician's assistant, and he learned to perform magic tricks as well.

Early career
Canuplin was noticed by the bodabil producer Lou Salvador, Sr. and hired as a Chaplin impersonator. He gained fame performing his Chaplin act and various magic tricks on the Manila bodabil circuit, appearing alongside stars such as Patsy and Bayani Casimiro. He also ventured into such films as Tinig ng Pag-ibig (1940), Luksang Bituin (1941) and Princesa Urduja (1942). One of his most notable roles was as the court jester in the 1941 LVN Pictures production of Ibong Adarna. In many of his films, Canuplin would appear in his Chaplin guise, wordless as was the silent film star.

Later career
During the Japanese occupation of the Philippines, film production was halted and Canuplin returned as a headliner in bodabil. He performed at the Life, Capitol and The Avenue theaters. After the war, he appeared in several other films until the 1950s.

Canuplin ended his entertainment career at the bodabil circuit where he remained until its waning years in the sixties. His last years were spent in relative obscurity in Tondo, though still recognized by his peers.

His last movie was Burlesk Queen was released in 1977 with the star of all seasons Vilma Santos.

Death
Canuplin died on September 4, 1979 in Manila, Philippines at the age of 75 years old.

Legacy
After his death, the playwright Manny Pambid wrote a play, Canuplin, on the bodabil star's rise and fall. It was staged by the Philippine Educational Theater Association in May 1980.

Filmography
 1930 – Collegian Love
 1940 – Tinig ng Pag-ibig
 1941 – Luksang Bituin
 1941 – Kung Kita'y Kapiling
 1942 – Princesa Urduja
 1947 – Dalawang Anino
 1948 – Waling-Waling
 1950 – Tubig na Hinugasan
 1955 – Salamangkero
 1961 – Operetang Sampay Bakod
 1977 – Burlesk Queen

Notes

External links

References

1904 births
1979 deaths
Impressionists (entertainers)
People from Tondo, Manila
20th-century Filipino male actors
Filipino magicians
Cultural depictions of Charlie Chaplin